Meana Sardo, or Meana in Sardinian, is a comune (municipality) in the Province of Nuoro in the Italian region of Sardinia, located about  north of Cagliari and about  southwest of Nuoro.

Meana Sardo borders the following municipalities: Aritzo, Atzara, Belvì, Laconi, and Samugheo.

Demographic evolution

References

Cities and towns in Sardinia